Billy Jagar (1870–1930) was an elder of the Yirrganydji people of north Queensland. He has been called the King of the Barron. After his death one of his king plates was lost for sixty years.

References 

Australian Aboriginal elders
1870 births
1930 deaths